Norbert Peter Stiles  (18 May 194230 October 2020) was an English footballer and manager. He played for England for five years, winning 28 caps and scoring one goal. He played every minute of England's victorious 1966 FIFA World Cup campaign. In the semi-final of that tournament against Portugal, he was given the job of marking the prolific Eusébio. His tough performance resulted in Eusébio being practically nullified for the entire game. Stiles also played in the final, which England won 4–2 against West Germany. His post-match dance on the Wembley pitch, holding the World Cup trophy in one hand and his false teeth in the other, was widely broadcast.

Stiles spent the majority of his club career for Manchester United, spending eleven years at Old Trafford, where he became renowned for his tough tackling and ball-winning qualities. Jonathan Wilson, writing for The Guardian in 2013, labelled Stiles as a type of holding midfielder he described as a "destroyer", a player who is primarily tasked with running, winning back possession, and distributing the ball to other players. 

With the Red Devils, he won two League titles and one European Cup. Stiles is one of only three Englishmen, alongside Bobby Charlton and Ian Callaghan, to have won both the World Cup and European Cup.

Stiles also had short spells with Middlesbrough and Preston North End.

Early life
Stiles grew up in Collyhurst, a working-class district of North Manchester, attending the local St Patrick's Catholic (Primary) School. He was born in the cellar of the family home during an air raid, the son of Charlie, a manager of an undertakers' parlour in a family business, and Kitty, who supplemented the family income working as a machinist.

Club career

Manchester United
Stiles supported Manchester United and his talent was swiftly recognised when he played for England Schoolboys at the age of 15. He achieved a childhood ambition when, in the same year, the club he supported gave him an apprenticeship in September 1959.

Stiles was an unlikely-looking footballer in many ways – he was short, at a time when teenagers were being rejected by clubs purely because of their lack of height; he also had several teeth missing and wore dentures, the removal of which prior to matches gave him a gap-toothed expression which had the potential to scare. He became significantly bald at a young age and sported a dramatic comb-over. He was also severely short-sighted, and needed strong contact lenses when playing, and wore thick spectacles off the field.

Nevertheless, Manchester United manager Matt Busby saw something in the tenacious youngster. Stiles was given his debut as a full back in October 1960 against Bolton Wanderers. Stiles's simple passing game and fearless ball-winning skills saw his swift conversion into a "holding" midfield player of a type now a feature of all top teams but still a rarity at a time when forward lines consisted of five players and the midfield was restricted to covering half-backs. His ability to gain and retain possession also allowed his teammates, such as Bobby Charlton and, later, George Best, to utilise more space on the field. Stiles's defensive skills were also utilised by United managers to great effect throughout his successful career.

That said, Busby was not afraid to sacrifice Stiles when required and when United beat Leicester City 3–1 in the 1963 FA Cup final, Stiles was not picked for the game. He began to make more frequent appearances in the seasons ahead, however, and won the First Division title in 1965.

In 1967, Stiles won his second League championship medal with Manchester United, but greater club honours were to come. United reached the European Cup final, which was to be staged at Wembley, and Stiles's old nemesis Eusébio was again someone he had to deal with as part of a fearsome attacking potential posed by opponents Benfica. Stiles played well without keeping Eusébio wholly quiet, and with the score at 1–1 and just a few minutes left, the Portuguese legend got away from the United defence with just goalkeeper Alex Stepney to beat, yet only managed to slam the ball straight into Stepney's midriff. United won 4–1 and became the first English club to lift Europe's main trophy.

Later career
After 395 matches and 19 goals, Manchester United sold Stiles in 1971 to Middlesbrough for £20,000. Two years later, he became a player-coach at Preston North End when Bobby Charlton was manager.

International career
On 10 April 1965, Stiles made his debut for the England national football team in a 2–2 draw against Scotland.

1966 FIFA World Cup
With England hosting the World Cup in 1966, manager Alf Ramsey had no competitive qualifying campaign to prepare, and therefore he spent the prior two years meticulously assessing players in friendly matches and British Home Championship games. With Bobby Charlton the only certainty for his World Cup midfield, he needed to create a trio of players to complement the Manchester United attacker and among those was the requirement for a "spoiler". Stiles was tested out for this role in a 2–2 draw against Scotland at Wembley on 10 April 1965. He kept his place for eight of the next nine internationals, scoring the only goal in a Wembley win against West Germany along the way, and by the time Ramsey confirmed his 22, it was thought likely that he would be in England's starting team for the World Cup.

Stiles won his 15th cap as England kicked off the competition with a goalless draw against Uruguay and maintained his place as the uncompromising hardman playing ahead of the back four and making sure there was space and time for the likes of Charlton ahead of him. With Stiles not missing a minute, England progressed through the group with wins over Mexico and France and then scraped past a violent Argentina side in the last eight. In the France game, Stiles seriously injured their midfielder Jacques Simon with a bad late tackle and there were calls from the media and FA for Stiles to be dropped. Ramsey publicly defended Stiles, being sure that the tackle was mistimed rather than malicious.

In the semi-final, Stiles performed an effective man-marking job on the Portuguese playmaker, and prolific goalscorer Eusébio, to the extent that the immensely skilled player was essentially nullified for the whole match, which England won 2–1. His tactics, despite the criticism they provoked from some, were effective; Eusébio's only major contribution was a late penalty, in a match where both sides were considered to have played attractive football in a good spirit with few fouls, and England progressed to the final. In the dressing room afterwards, Ramsey praised Stiles's individual performance, a rare accolade.

Stiles, winning his 20th cap, had no man-marking brief against West Germany but played a strong, tough match as England saw a 2–1 lead levelled with the last kick of the game before Geoff Hurst completed a hat-trick to win the competition in extra time. At the final whistle, Stiles did a spontaneous jig with the Jules Rimet Trophy in his hand while holding his false teeth in the other. Thirty years later this moment would be referred to by Frank Skinner and David Baddiel in the lyrics to "Three Lions", the England theme song written with the Lightning Seeds for Euro 96: in the 1996 version, a list of English football memories ends with "...Nobby dancing", and in the 1998 version, in a reference to the World Cup finals taking place in France, the middle section consists of the line: "We can dance Nobby's dance, we can dance it in France".

UEFA Euro 1968 and 1970 FIFA World Cup
Stiles played in the next four internationals but was deemed to have performed poorly as England lost to Scotland at Wembley in 1967 and was dropped by Ramsey. Stiles was selected for the England squad which contested the 1968 European Championships, but the holding role in midfield had been taken by Tottenham Hotspur's Alan Mullery. England went out to Yugoslavia in the semi-finals, during which Mullery became the first ever England player to be sent off. Stiles was recalled for the otherwise meaningless third place play-off game against the Soviet Union, but it was clear that despite his misdemeanour, Mullery was now Ramsey's first choice.

Stiles played just once for England in 1969 and twice in 1970. He was selected by Ramsey for the 1970 World Cup in Mexico, but only as Mullery's understudy, and not only did he not get a kick during the competition as England surrendered the title in the quarter-final, he never played for his country again. He ended with 28 caps – ultimately the least capped member of the 1966 XI – and one goal.

Managerial and post-playing career
In August 1975, Stiles was appointed as caretaker manager of Preston when Bobby Charlton resigned in protest at the transfer of defender John Bird to Newcastle United, but he resigned a week later in support of his former Manchester United teammate. Stiles returned to Preston to serve as manager from 22 July 1977 to 1 June 1981.

Stiles joined the exodus of ageing and semi-retired European players to the NASL in 1981, to become coach of the Vancouver Whitecaps, spending three years at the Canadian club.

On 29 September 1985, Stiles took over as manager of West Bromwich Albion; however, he was sacked the following February after the side managed only three wins under his leadership, and this was his final stab at management. He later revealed his struggle with depression while in the job, finding it tough to cope with working in the Midlands and the daily commute from Manchester where his family lived.

Between 1989 and 1993 he worked for Manchester United as their youth team coach, developing the considerable skills of teenage prodigies such as David Beckham, Ryan Giggs, and Paul Scholes. Nicky Butt and the Neville brothers, Gary and Phil, also came through at this time.

In 2000, Stiles was awarded his MBE after a campaign by sections of the media who were surprised that five of the 1966 team had never been officially decorated for their achievements. Stiles duly joined Alan Ball, Roger Hunt, Ray Wilson and George Cohen in collecting his gong.

Career statistics

Club

International

Scores and results list England's goal tally first, score column indicates score after each Stiles goal.

Honours

Club
Manchester United
Football League First Division: 1964–65, 1966–67
FA Cup: 1962-63
FA Charity Shield: 1965 (shared), 1967 (shared)
European Cup: 1967–68

International
England
FIFA World Cup: 1966

Individual
Football League 100 Legends: 1998 (inducted)
English Football Hall of Fame: 2007 (inducted)
PFA Team of the Century (1907–1976): 2007
FAI International Football Awards – International Personality: 1998

Personal life
Stiles married Kay Giles in June 1963. His wife was a sister of Johnny Giles and they were introduced to each other around the time they were teammates at Manchester United. They lived in Manchester and had three children. Stiles' son John was also a footballer, playing for Shamrock Rovers in Dublin and Leeds United in the 1980s.

Stiles was a devout Catholic throughout his life, and even tried to attend mass on the day of the world cup final. In 1968, Stiles released his first autobiography, Soccer My Battlefield; his second, After the Ball, followed in 2003. In 2007, he was inducted into the English Football Hall of Fame.

Stiles's FIFA World Cup medal and a European Cup medal were bought by Manchester United for more than £200,000 at an auction on 27 October 2010. The World Cup medal, which Stiles won in the 1966 final against West Germany, sold for £160,000. His European Cup medal, which he won with Manchester United in 1968, was also sold, realising more than £49,000. Stiles sold the medals so that his family could benefit from the proceeds.

A teenage Stiles, then a Manchester United apprentice, was portrayed by actor Kyle Ward in a 2011 BBC TV drama, United, which was centred around the Munich air disaster in 1958, in which eight of United's senior players died.

On 24 November 2013, it was announced that Stiles was diagnosed with prostate cancer, and in 2016, it was announced that he was suffering from advanced dementia. He was too ill to attend a celebration dinner to mark the 50th anniversary of England's 1966 World Cup win. In November 2017, a BBC documentary on the subject of brain injuries amongst retired footballers presented by former England striker Alan Shearer included an interview with Stiles' son.

Stiles died on 30 October 2020, aged 78, after suffering with prostate cancer and dementia as a result of chronic traumatic encephalopathy (CTE) from the repeated heading of footballs. Stiles's brain was donated to the FIELD study conducted by Dr Willie Stewart into the link between dementia and a career in professional football. Stiles was one of five England players from the 1966 World Cup final that died from or suffered from dementia.

Notes

References

Specific

General 
 Keeling, Peter (1971). Nobby Stiles. London: Wolfe, .
 McKinstry, Leo (2006). Sir Alf. London: HarperSport. .
 Stiles, Nobby (2003). After the Ball: My Autobiography. London: Hodder & Stoughton, .
 Tyers, Alan (2007). "The Sixties...Be Sure to Wear False Teeth in Your Hair", Football365

External links
 
 FA.com profile
 Sporting Heroes profile

1942 births
2020 deaths
English footballers
England international footballers
English football managers
Manchester United F.C. players
Middlesbrough F.C. players
Preston North End F.C. managers
Preston North End F.C. players
West Bromwich Albion F.C. managers
1966 FIFA World Cup players
UEFA Euro 1968 players
1970 FIFA World Cup players
FIFA World Cup-winning players
Association football midfielders
People from Collyhurst
Footballers from Manchester
English Roman Catholics
Members of the Order of the British Empire
English Football League players
English Football Hall of Fame inductees
English Football League representative players
UEFA Champions League winning players
English expatriate sportspeople in Canada
Expatriate soccer managers in Canada
English expatriate football managers
Sportspeople with chronic traumatic encephalopathy
Deaths from chronic traumatic encephalopathy